Christopher Messina (born August 11, 1974) is an American actor, director, writer, and producer. He is best known for starring as Danny Castellano in the Fox/Hulu romantic comedy series The Mindy Project (2012–2017), which earned him two nominations for the Critics' Choice Television Award for Best Actor in a Comedy Series.

He has appeared in films such as Vicky Cristina Barcelona (2008), Julie & Julia (2009), Devil (2010), Argo (2012), Ruby Sparks (2012), Celeste and Jesse Forever (2012), Cake (2014), Birds of Prey (2020), and I Care a Lot (2020). Messina wrote, executive produced, and starred in the comedy film Fairhaven (2012). He also directed and starred in the drama film Alex of Venice (2014).

On television, Messina appeared in such roles as Ted Fairwell in the HBO drama series Six Feet Under (2005), Chris Sanchez in the Audience Network legal thriller series Damages (2011–2012), Reese Lansing in the HBO political drama series The Newsroom (2012–2014), Richard Willis in the HBO miniseries Sharp Objects (2018), as Nick Haas in the USA Network crime drama series The Sinner (2020) and as Angelo Lano in the Starz political miniseries Gaslit (2022).

Early life and education
Messina was raised in Northport, New York, on Long Island, where he studied theater in high school. He attended Marymount Manhattan College, but dropped out after one semester.

Career
He studied acting privately with teachers around Manhattan, and started his career as an off-Broadway actor. He has appeared in episodes of the television series Law & Order, Third Watch, and Medium. He had a recurring role in the fifth and final season of the HBO drama series Six Feet Under as Ted Fairwell. His film credits include Rounders, The Siege, You've Got Mail, and Towelhead. 

He starred in an HBO pilot Anatomy of Hope, directed by J. J. Abrams. Simon Callow also starred, but the pilot was not picked up to series. In October 2007, Daily Variety named him as one of ten actors to watch. He starred in Devil, under the direction of John Erick Dowdle and Drew Dowdle, for producer M. Night Shyamalan and Universal Pictures. In April 2010, Monogamy, directed by Dana Adam Shapiro and starring Messina and Rashida Jones, premiered at the Tribeca Film Festival, where the film won the jury prize for Best New York Narrative.

Messina joined the cast of Damages for its fourth and fifth seasons. He played a recurring character on HBO's The Newsroom. Messina was a series regular on the Fox/Hulu sitcom The Mindy Project, playing Dr. Danny Castellano, until his character was eventually phased out in seasons 4 & 5. He makes his return in three episodes, including the season and series finale, in season 6.

In 2014, Messina played the role of a cheating spouse in the music video for Sam Smith's "I'm Not the Only One". That same year, he directed the independent drama, Alex of Venice, starring Mary Elizabeth Winstead, Don Johnson and Matthew Del Negro. He co-starred in Ben Affleck's crime drama Live by Night, which was released in December 2016. In 2018, Messina starred in a leading role alongside Amy Adams in the HBO series Sharp Objects.

In 2020, Chris Messina starred as mob killer Victor Zsasz in Birds of Prey. When asked how he felt about playing a twisted character, Messina replied, "I've played too many nice guys in my career. So it was like just really a lot of fun to let loose." 

In 2021, Messina portrayed attorney Dean Ericson in the black comedy thriller I Care a Lot.

Personal life
Messina and his wife Jennifer Todd have two sons, Milo and Giovanni, born in 2008 and 2009, respectively. He was previously married to actress Rosemarie DeWitt for 12 years, divorcing in 2006.

Filmography

Film

Television

Stage

Awards and nominations

References

External links
 
 
 

1974 births
20th-century American male actors
21st-century American male actors
American male film actors
American male stage actors
American male television actors
American male voice actors
Living people
Male actors from New York (state)
Outstanding Performance by a Cast in a Motion Picture Screen Actors Guild Award winners
People from Northport, New York
American people of Italian descent